Steglitz-Zehlendorf is the sixth borough of Berlin, formed in Berlin's 2001 administrative reform by merging the former boroughs of Steglitz and Zehlendorf.

Home to Free University of Berlin, the Berlin Botanical Garden, and a variety of museums and art collections, Steglitz-Zehlendorf is an important hub for research, science and culture in Berlin. It is known to be the wealthiest borough of Berlin, having the city's highest median household income.

History 
The first mention of a present-day locality in the district by name was Lankwitz (Lancewitz) in 1239. It is assumed that Slavic and German settlements were established at the Schlachtensee and Krume Lanke lakes after 1200 at the latest. The first documented mention of Zehlendorf (then Cedelendorp) dates back to 1242. Here the Lehnin Abbey bought the settlement and kept it until 1542. Frederick the Great donated a church to the village in 1768 during a stopover on the journey from the Berlin Palace to the Sanssouci Palace. The settlement was located halfway between the two places, which gave the village an economic boost through its function as a relay station. Steglitz also originated in the first half of the 13th century as a Linear settlement. At the end of this century the wooden church was replaced with the village church Steglitz. It stood until the 19th century, when it was replaced by Matthew's Church.

Today's double district is still characterized by connecting infrastructure between Berlin and Potsdam. For example, the first section of the Reichsstraße 1 was routed through Steglitz and Zehlendorf (paved in 1792). In 1838, the Stammbahn was opened parallel to this. This development of the suburbs led to a strong growth of the settlements. Steglitz became the largest rural municipality in Prussia around 1900 with 80,000 inhabitants. The former districts of Steglitz and Zehlendorf were formed in 1920 during the formation of Greater Berlin from previously independent rural communities and estate districts of the Teltow district. The entire area of the present district belonged to the American Sector of Berlin after the Second World War from 1945 to 1990, together with the districts of Tempelhof, Schöneberg, Neukölln and Kreuzberg. In 2001, the two formerly independent districts were merged to form the district of Steglitz-Zehlendorf as part of Berlin's administrative reform. In December 2020, the new Locality Schlachtensee was founded on the initiative of local residents.

Demographics
As of 2021, Steglitz-Zehlendorf had a population of roughly 306 000, making it the fifth most populous out of Berlin's twelve boroughs. The median age was 46,5, the highest of all Berlin boroughs. 28,8% of Steglitz-Zehlendorf residents had a migration background, lying under the Berlin average of 36%.

Steglitz-Zehlendorf has the highest number of Abitur (secondary education degree) graduates in Berlin. The borough also has the highest median household income and the lowest unemployment rate in Berlin. With 15% of Steglitz-Zehlendorf households making more than 200% of the German national median income, it is the wealthiest Berlin borough.

Subdivision

Since December 2020, the Steglitz-Zehlendorf borough consists of eight localities:

Politics

District council
The governing body of Steglitz-Zehlendorf is the district council (Bezirksverordnetenversammlung). It has responsibility for passing laws and electing the city government, including the mayor. The most recent district council election was held on 26 September 2021, and the results were as follows: 

! colspan=2| Party
! Lead candidate
! Votes
! %
! +/-
! Seats
! +/-
|-
| bgcolor=| 
| align=left| Christian Democratic Union (CDU)
| align=left| Cerstin Richter-Kotowski
| 48,961
| 27.2
|  1.2
| 17
| ±0
|-
| bgcolor=| 
| align=left| Alliance 90/The Greens (Grüne)
| align=left| Maren Schellenberg
| 40,184
| 22.4
|  2.7
| 14
|  3
|-
| bgcolor=| 
| align=left| Social Democratic Party (SPD)
| align=left| Carolina Böhm
| 39,079
| 21.7
|  0.8
| 13
| ±0
|-
| bgcolor=| 
| align=left| Free Democratic Party (FDP)
| align=left| Mathia Specht-Habbel
| 16,997
| 9.5
|  0.4
| 5
| ±0
|-
| bgcolor=| 
| align=left| Alternative for Germany (AfD)
| align=left| Peer Döhnert
| 9,245
| 5.1
|  5.4
| 3
|  3
|-
| bgcolor=| 
| align=left| The Left (LINKE)
| align=left| Pia Imhof-Speckmann
| 9,007
| 5.0
|  1.0
| 3
| ±0
|-
| colspan=8 bgcolor=lightgrey|
|-
| bgcolor=| 
| align=left| Tierschutzpartei
| align=left| 
| 4,503
| 2.5
| New
| 0
| New
|-
| bgcolor=| 
| align=left| dieBasis
| align=left| 
| 2,750
| 1.5
| New
| 0
| New
|-
| bgcolor=| 
| align=left| Volt Germany
| align=left| 
| 2,595
| 1.4
| New
| 0
| New
|-
| bgcolor=| 
| align=left| Die PARTEI
| align=left| 
| 2,332
| 1.3
| New
| 0
| New
|-
| bgcolor=| 
| align=left| Free Voters
| align=left| 
| 1,797
| 1.0
| New
| 0
| New
|-
| bgcolor=| 
| align=left| Klimaliste
| align=left| 
| 911
| 0.5
| New
| 0
| New
|-
| bgcolor=| 
| align=left| Pirate Party Germany
| align=left| 
| 832
| 0.5
|  1.9
| 0
| ±0
|-
| bgcolor=| 
| align=left| The Humanists
| align=left| 
| 503
| 0.3
| New
| 0
| New
|-
! colspan=3| Valid votes
! 179,696
! 99.2
! 
! 
! 
|-
! colspan=3| Invalid votes
! 1,431
! 0.8
! 
! 
! 
|-
! colspan=3| Total
! 181,127
! 100.0
! 
! 55
! ±0
|-
! colspan=3| Electorate/voter turnout
! 234,324
! 77.3
!  6.1
! 
! 
|-
| colspan=8| Source: Elections Berlin
|}

District government
The district mayor (Bezirksbürgermeister) is elected by the Bezirksverordnetenversammlung, and positions in the district government (Bezirksamt) are apportioned based on party strength. Maren Schellenberg of the Greens was elected mayor on 8 December 2021. Since the 2021 municipal elections, the composition of the district government is as follows:

Landmarks
 The Bierpinsel (literally: "Beer Brush"), a 1970s style tower in Steglitz
 The Botanical Garden in Lichterfelde West
 The Lichterfelde West Villenkolonie – exclusive residential area from 1860 with tree lined and cobbled streets
 Glienicke Palace
 Glienicke Hunting Lodge
 The Philological Library at the Free University of Berlin in Dahlem, by Norman Foster
 Prussian Privy State Archives in Dahlem
 The Wannsee: lake, villa (site of the notorious Wannsee Conference), and lido
 Liebermann Villa, former residence of the painter Max Liebermann, today a museum for his art at the Wannsee
 Pfaueninsel (Peacock Island), with the same named castle in the Wannsee
 Berlin Mexikoplatz station, Art Nouveau railway station in Zehlendorf

Gallery

Education

Gymnasiums
 Arndt-Gymnasium Dahlem in Dahlem
 Beethoven-Gymnasium in Lankwitz
 Dreilinden-Gymnasium in Nikolassee
 Droste-Hülshoff-Schule in Zehlendorf
 Fichtenberg-Oberschule in Steglitz
 Goethe-Gymnasium in Lichterfelde
 Gymnasium Steglitz in Steglitz
 Hermann-Ehlers-Gymnasium in Steglitz
 Königin-Luise-Stiftung in Dahlem
 Lilienthal-Gymnasium in Lichterfelde
 Paulsen-Gymnasium  in Steglitz
 Schadow-Gymnasium in Zehlendorf
 Werner-von-Siemens-Gymnasium in Nikolassee
 Willi-Graf-Gymnasium in Lichterfelde
 Freie Schule Anne-Sophie Berlin in Zehlendorf

Locations for science
 American Academy in Berlin 
 Biologische Bundesanstalt für Land- und Forstwirtschaft
 Centre for Modern Oriental Studies
 Charité – Campus Benjamin Franklin
 German Federal Archives - branch office Berlin: central archive of the German Reich and the GDR
 Federal Institute for Materials Research and Testing
 Freie Universität Berlin (Free University of Berlin) in Dahlem
 Philological Library of Freie Universität Berlin
 Otto Suhr Institute for Political Science
 German Archaeological Institute
 Helmholtz-Zentrum Berlin für Materialien und Energie
 Institute for Museum Research
 Japanische Internationale Schule zu Berlin, a Japanese international school, is in the Wannsee community in Steglitz-Zehlendorf.
 Krankenhaus Waldfriede
 Max Planck Society
 Fritz Haber Institute of the Max Planck Society
 Max Planck Institute for Human Development
 Max Planck Institute for Molecular Genetics
 Max Planck Institute for the History of Science
 Prussian Privy State Archives
 Zuse Institute Berlin

Twin towns – sister cities

Steglitz-Zehlendorf is twinned with:

 Brøndby, Denmark (1968)
 Cassino, Italy (1969)
 Hagen, Germany (1967)
 Industrialnyi (Kharkiv), Ukraine (1990)
 Kazimierz Dolny, Poland (1993)
 Kiryat Bialik, Israel (1966)
 Königs Wusterhausen, Germany (1988)
 Lüchow-Dannenberg, Germany (1979)
 Nałęczów, Poland (1993)
 Nentershausen, Germany (1966)
 Poniatowa, Poland
 Rendsburg-Eckernförde, Germany (1964)
 Ronneby, Sweden (1976)
 Sderot, Israel (1975)
 Sochos, Greece (1993)
 Songpa (Seoul), South Korea (2013)
 Szilvásvárad, Hungary (1989)
 Westerwald, Germany (1970)
 Zugló (Budapest), Hungary (2008)

In 2020 Steglitz-Zehlendorf dissociated itself from its twin town of Kazimierz Dolny in Poland because the latter declared itself an LGBT free zone. There is a debate about terminating the partnership.

See also

 Berlin-Steglitz-Zehlendorf (electoral district)

References

External links

Official homepage 
Official homepage of Berlin

 
Districts of Berlin